Grandview is an unincorporated community in Raleigh County, West Virginia, United States.

The community was so named on account of its elevated town site.

References 

Unincorporated communities in West Virginia
Unincorporated communities in Raleigh County, West Virginia